Gardener of Eden is a 2007 American comedy-drama film directed by Kevin Connolly. It stars Lukas Haas, Erika Christensen and Giovanni Ribisi.

The film premiered at the Tribeca Film Festival, and was Connolly's directorial debut. It was produced by his friend Leonardo DiCaprio.

Plot
Adam Harris, a twenty-something college dropout, returns to his hometown, the fictional "Bickleton" in New Jersey, and moves back in with his parents. Lacking real direction in his life, Adam spends his time working at a local deli and hanging out with his equally unambitious friends. Adam soon finds himself unemployed and cut off by his friends.

Adam's life changes dramatically when he accidentally captures a serial rapist named Richard Pope who has just attacked a local girl, Mona Hukley. The new-found attention inspires him to become a vigilante.

Cast

Release
Gardener of Eden premiered at the Tribeca Film Festival on April 26, 2007. After the film was shown, Connolly gave a short-lived Q&A session.

Reception
In a review for The Hollywood Reporter, Frank Scheck praised the film's "resolute strangeness and darkness" and Haas's "memorably quirky performance", but suggested that it "lacks the necessary dramatic urgency or black humor to connect with audiences".

References

External links
 
 
 

2007 films
2000s English-language films
American independent films
American superhero films
2007 comedy-drama films
Films set in New Jersey
Films shot in New Jersey
Superhero comedy-drama films
Films directed by Kevin Connolly
American comedy-drama films
Films produced by Leonardo DiCaprio
Appian Way Productions films
Films scored by Paul Haslinger
2007 directorial debut films
2007 independent films
2000s American films